Ronan O'Connor may refer to:

Sportspeople
Ronan O'Connor (Ballyduff Gaelic footballer), Gaelic footballer and hurler for Kerry
Ronan O'Connor (St Michael's/Foilmore Gaelic footballer), Gaelic footballer for Kerry

Other people
Ronan O'Connor, protagonist of the 2014 video game Murdered: Soul Suspect